Alexis Flores Cucoch-Petraello (born 14 December 1980) was a Chilean footballer.

External links
 
 

1980 births
Living people
Chilean footballers
Trasandino footballers
Puerto Montt footballers
Deportes Copiapó footballers
Deportes Santa Cruz footballers
San Luis de Quillota footballers
Coquimbo Unido footballers
Chilean Primera División players
Primera B de Chile players
Association football defenders